Corbenay is a commune in the Haute-Saône department in the region of Bourgogne-Franche-Comté in eastern France. Its coat of arms features a heraldic three hares motif.

References

Communes of Haute-Saône